William Eberhardt Bastard, also known as Ebbo Bastard (10 February 1912 – 14 February 1949), was a South African rugby union player from Kokstad, Natal. He predominantly played as a flanker and played for Natal and the South Africa national rugby union team. On 14 February 1949 he was shot dead by his wife's ex-husband.

Personal life 
Bastard was educated at Hilton College. After leaving school, he started farming, which was his profession for the rest of his life. During the Second World War he joined the South African Army and was assigned to the Natal Mounted Rifles, where he saw service in the Western Desert Campaign.

Career 
Bastard started playing rugby for Kokstad RFC and made it onto the representative team of Natal. He was highly thought of in Natal, but when trials for the 1937 Springboks tour of Australia and New Zealand were announced at Newlands Stadium, Bastard was not invited. The Natal RFU were convinced he should be there, so they sponsored him to attend the trial without an invitation.

Following an impressive performance at the trials, Bastard was called up to the South Africa national rugby team for the tour of Australia and New Zealand, becoming the first and only Kokstad player to play for the Springboks. During his first match, he scored a try in a 9–5 win. He also scored a try against New Zealand in the second test match at Lancaster Park in Christchurch.

During the tour, his surname became a point of contention. At the first banquet of the tour in Australia, he was introduced as "Ebbo Jardine" after the English cricketer Douglas Jardine, who captained England during the infamous "bodyline" series against Australia. During Australian radio match commentaries, he was referred to as "one player who we shall call Smith". Following a match in Brisbane, he was spoken to by a Queensland Police Force constable who followed him, and caught Bastard and three other Springboks climbing a neon sign, which was smashed as a result. The policeman had spoken to the other Springbok players before coming to Bastard and asked for his name. Being given the name and thinking it was a joke, the policeman said, "I don't want to know what you are, I want to know who you are". Later in Sydney with Daantjie van de Vyver, a similar incident occurred when they were climbing lampposts. The 
New South Wales Police Force constable asked for their names; Bastard gave his and spelled it out for the policeman, with van de Vyver saying his surname straight afterward. The policeman replied, "No bastard is going to get a fiver out of me". He also played for the Springboks a year later against the British Lions in his last test match for South Africa.

Test history

Death and legacy 
When away from rugby, Bastard spent his time farming. He eventually moved to a farm in Cedarville, where he lived next door to Una and Peter Young. During this time, Bastard made open advances toward Una, who later left her husband and married Bastard.

One night at a cocktail party, Bastard and Una had taunted Young, who left and waited for Bastard to arrive home from the party. Once Bastard got out of the car, Young shot him point blank in the chest. The Monday newspapers published the news as: "Ebbo Bastard murdered!". Young also was injured in the shooting, but was arrested.

Following Bastard's death, his wife and son, the future journalist and sausage merchant Bill O'Hagan, adopted her maiden name.

Bastard's name is given to the "Ebbo Bastard Trophy", a rugby trophy contested by regional teams in KwaZulu-Natal.

See also
 List of South Africa national rugby union players – Springbok no. 252

References 

1912 births
1949 deaths
Alumni of Hilton College (South Africa)
Deaths by firearm in South Africa
People from Kokstad
People murdered in South Africa
Rugby union flankers
South Africa international rugby union players
South African farmers
South African military personnel of World War II
White South African people
Rugby union players from KwaZulu-Natal
Sharks (rugby union) players